Mercury zinc telluride (HgZnTe, MZT) is a telluride of mercury and zinc, an alloy of mercury telluride and zinc telluride. It is a narrow-gap semiconductor material.

Mercury zinc telluride is used in infrared detectors and arrays for infrared imaging and infrared astronomy.

Mercury zinc telluride has better chemical, thermal, and mechanical stability than mercury cadmium telluride.  The bandgap of MZT is more sensitive to composition fluctuations than that of MCT, which may be an issue for reproducible device fabrication.  MZT is less amenable than MCT to fabrication of complex heterostructures by molecular beam epitaxy.

See also
 Cadmium zinc telluride
 Mercury cadmium telluride

External links
 National Pollutant Inventory - Mercury and compounds Fact Sheet

Mercury(II) compounds
Zinc compounds
Tellurides
II-VI semiconductors
Infrared sensor materials